The Secret Son is a 1979 French film written and directed by Philippe Garrel. It stars Anne Wiazemsky as Elie and Henri de Maublanc as Jean-Baptiste, a filmmaker. The original film score was composed by Faton Cahen who reprised his collaboration with Garrel on Liberté, la nuit (1983), Paris vu par… 20 ans après (1984) and J'entends plus la guitare (1991). It was premiered in Paris in 1979 and received wider release in 1982. In October 2017, it was released in cinemas in the United States. The film won Prix Jean Vigo in 1982.

Cast
 Anne Wiazemsky as Elie
 Henri de Maublanc as Jean-Baptiste
 Xuan Lindenmeyer as Swann, Elie's child
 Cécile Le Bailly as Chloé
 Elli Medeiros as the whore
 Philippe Garrel as the psychiatric patient
 Ari Päffgen as the boy
 Eliane Roy as Jean-Baptiste's mother

References

External links
 

1972 films
French black-and-white films
French drama films
Films directed by Philippe Garrel
1970s French films